Intangible cultural heritage (Ukrainian: Нематеріальна культурна спадщина) are elements of the cultural heritage of Ukraine which are abstract and must be learned, encompassing traditional knowledge including festivals, music, performances, celebrations, handicrafts, and oral traditions.

Starting from 2013, five items are inscribed on the registry of Ukraine's Intangible Cultural Heritage as of March 2022. Four of them have been placed on the UNESCO Intangible Cultural Heritage Lists, and the fifth - recognition of the unique culture of Ukrainian borscht cooking - was held in a backlog of nominations.

UNESCO inscribed list of Intangible Cultural Heritage of Ukraine

References 

Heritage registers in Ukraine
Intangible Cultural Heritage of Humanity
Cultural heritage